The Marriott Theatre in Lincolnshire, Illinois is a respected Chicago area regional theatre. Attached to the Marriott Lincolnshire Resort, the theatre produces an average of five musicals each year, presented in the round, as well as productions aimed at younger audiences. A small, live orchestra provides accompaniment.

History
Founded in December 1975, The Marriott Theatre has presented more than 170 musicals and is currently led by Executive Producer Peter Blair and Artistic Director Peter Marston Sullivan. It is the most subscribed musical theatre in the country. 

The Marriott Theatre has presented more than 3,000 professional actors in classic American musical theatre, new musicals, and "re-thought" musicals.  Broadway has long considered The Marriott Theatre a prime venue for launching shows into the regional market with premiere productions of A Chorus Line, Chess, Baby, Grand Hotel, They're Playing Our Song, The Goodbye Girl, The First, Miss Saigon, Cats, Sunset Boulevard, Beauty and the Beast, Thoroughly Modern Millie, The Producers and Little Women.

A founding member of the National Alliance for Musical Theatre, The Marriott Theatre fosters artists in creating new works for the stage.  The result has been a string of American and World Premieres including Matador, which subsequently played London's West End; Annie Warbucks, launching a national tour and opening off-Broadway in New York to rave reviews; Phantom of the Country Palace, Grover's Corners, Maury Yeston's History Loves Company (1991), Windy City, The New Yorkers, Queen of the Stardust Ballroom, Peggy Sue Got Married, Once Upon a Time in New Jersey, The All Night Strut, A Fascinatin' Rhythm, Married Alive, The Bowery Boys, For The Boys, and Hero.

Marriott's Theatre for Young Audiences has presented numerous original works as well as classic fairy tales. To date, Marriott's Theatre for Young Audiences has presented more than 45 productions. Every year, these musicals introduce more than 100,000 children to live theatre.  In all, The Marriott Theatre attracts more than 400,000 people to Lincolnshire each year.

Shows

1980
Barbara Eden
Phyllis Diller
Rodgers & Hart
The Sound of Music
Hay Fever
Cabaret
Kiss Me, Kate
Oliver!

1981
Man of La Mancha
A Little Night Music
South Pacific 
They're Playing Our Song world premiere

1982
Fiddler on the Roof
Kismet
Little Me world premiere
Brigadoon

1983
Shenandoah
Give My Regards to Broadway world premiere
Chicago
Gypsy: A Musical Fable

1984
Windy City
The Boys from Syracuse
A Day in Hollywood / A Night in the Ukraine
Carousel

1985
Joseph and the Amazing Technicolor Dreamcoat
Startime world premiere
A Chorus Line
Hello, Dolly!

1986
Camelot
Baby world premiere
The King and I

1987
The Wiz
1776
Grover's Corners world premiere
My Fair Lady

1988
Evita
Do Black Patent Leather Shoes Really Reflect Up?
Cabaret
West Side Story
Peter Pan

1989
Big River
70, Girls, 70
Matador world premiere
Grease
Funny Girl

1990
Chess, a new version. Directed by David H. Bell and starring Susie McMonagle, David Studwell and Kim Strauss, it featured a reworking of Richard Nelson's New York script.  Bell's version has since been performed in Sacramento and Atlanta as well.
Into the Woods
Pump Boys and Dinettes
South Pacific
Me and My Girl

1991
Encore world premiere
Brigadoon
Sweet Charity
History Loves Company world premiere
Anything Goes

1992
Annie Warbucks premiere
Little Shop of Horrors
Arthur premiere
Grand Hotel
The Sound of Music

1993
The First: A Musical premiere
Oklahoma!
Hot Mikado special presentation
Sweeney Todd
42nd Street

1994
Windy City encore presentation
Phantom of the Country Palace premiere
The Goodbye Girl special presentation
La Cage aux Folles
The Music Man

1995
Hello, Dolly!
Ms. Cinderella premiere
Dreamgirls
Heartbeats premiere
Eleanor premiere

1996
And the World Goes 'Round
The New Yorkers
The Best Little Whorehouse in Texas
How to Succeed in Business Without Really Trying
Singin' in the Rain

1997
The Will Rogers Follies
Kismet
Nunsense
Baby
Guys & Dolls

1998
Elmer Gantry premiere
Gypsy
I Love You, You're Perfect, Now Change
Queen/Stardust Ballroom premiere
Finian's Rainbow
The Wizard of Oz

1999
Do Black Patent Leather Shoes Really Reflect Up?
Victor/Victoria
Houdini premiere
Peggy Sue Got Married premiere
Phantom

2000
Joseph and the Amazing Technicolor Dreamcoat
The Pirates of Penzance
Pump Boys & Dinettes
Evita
The King & I

2001
Big River
Mame
The Taffetas
Miss Saigon special presentation
Bye Bye Birdie

2002
Honk!
Damn Yankees
1776
Carousel
Funny Girl

2003
Cats special presentation
Hot Mikado encore presentation
Forever Plaid
Show Boat
Annie Get Your Gun

2004
West Side Story
The Pajama Game
Ain't Misbehavin'
Sunset Boulevard special presentation
Beauty and the Beast special presentation

2005
Swing!
Brigadoon
A Funny Thing Happened on the Way to the Forum
Footloose
Oliver!

2006
Thoroughly Modern Millie
State Fair
Once Upon a Time in New Jersey premiere
Into the Woods
All Night Strut premiere

2007
Grease
Shenandoah special presentation
Married Alive premiere
The Producers
Little Women

2008
Les Misérables
Nunsense
The Full Monty
All Shook Up special presentation
The Bowery Boys world premiere

2009
Joseph and the Amazing Technicolor Dreamcoat
The 25th Annual Putnam County Spelling Bee
The Light in the Piazza
Hairspray
My Fair Lady

2010
Fiddler on the Roof
The Drowsy Chaperone
Once on This Island
A Chorus Line
The Music Man

2011
Guys and Dolls
42nd Street
SHOUT! The Mod Musical
For the Boys world premiere
White Christmas

2012
Legally Blonde: The Musical
The Pirates of Penzance
Hero world premiere
Dreamgirls
My One and Only

2013
Now and Forever: The Music of Andrew Lloyd Webber
South Pacific
I Love You, You're Perfect, Now Change
9 to 5: The Musical
Mary Poppins

2014
Cabaret
Cats
Godspell
On the Town
The King and I

2015
La Cage aux Folles
Anything Goes
City of Angels
October Sky
Elf: The Musical

2016
Sister Act
Evita
Man of La Mancha
How to Succeed in Business Without Really Trying
Singin' in the Rain

2017
Mamma Mia!
She Loves Me
The Bridges of Madison County
Honeymoon in Vegas
Newsies

2018
Ragtime!
Oklahoma!
Murder for Two
Sweet Charity
Irving Berlin's Holiday Inn

2019
Million Dollar Quartet
Footloose
Darling Grenadine
Something Rotten!
Oliver!

2020
The 2020 season was interrupted by the COVID-19 pandemic and continued once it was determined to be safe to congregate.
Grease

2021
(A continuation of the announced 2020 season)
Kiss Me, Kate
And the World Goes 'Round

2022
(A continuation of the announced 2020 season with two additional shows)
West Side Story
The Sound of Music
Hello, Dolly!
A Christmas Story: The Musical

2023
Big Fish
Damn Yankees
Buddy: The Buddy Holly Story
Gypsy
Beautiful: The Carole King Musical

References

External links 
Marriott Theatre official website
Marriott Profile
2008 Season
2007 Season
Metromix Description
Theatre in Chicago

1975 establishments in Illinois
Lincolnshire, Illinois
Theatres in Illinois
Buildings and structures in Lake County, Illinois
Tourist attractions in Lake County, Illinois